Ōwhango is a small town in New Zealand situated about  south of Taumarunui on State Highway 4 (SH4), and about  west of the Whakapapa River, a tributary of the nascent Whanganui River.

Ōwhango has been the official name since 16 July 2020. It is a Māori name that translates as "the place of wheezy noises".

The village features a backdrop of native forest and Mount Ruapehu, with native birds like tūī and kererū. The domain, set amongst native forest, includes large open playing fields, children's play area and two tennis courts.

The Main Trunk Line passes through Ōwhango on the western side of State Highway 4, with two crossing points for vehicles, one controlled (Owhango Road, centrally located) and the other uncontrolled (Onematua Road, on the northern boundary). From 1905 to 1985 Ōwhango had a railway station.

Geography

Ōwhango is located on the 39° latitude line, placing it on the boundary of the old Auckland Province and Wellington Province.

Halfway through Ōwhango is a sign marking "39° South". This sign is accurate (to within a few metres) when using NZ Geodetic Datum 1949. The position of 39° South when using WGS84 (or NZ Geodetic Datum 2000) is about 196 metres further south,  but this is not marked.

The native forest is part of the Ohinetonga Scenic Reserve which contains unlogged old growth native forest containing some forest giants and a pretty lagoon accessible from a looped walking track. A road through the reserve, signposted from the State Highway, leads down to the view from the old logging bridge over the Whakapapa River. Along the river are memorable picnic spots with superb swimming pools containing rainbow and brown trout. It is also a launch point for kayakers heading for Kakahi, or even further down the Whanganui River.

Beyond the bridge is the vast expanse of Tongariro Forest Conservation Area, once the source of timber for local mills, but now protected as conservation land thanks to a successful campaign in the 1980s led by local people to save the forest from clearance. Bisecting the forest is one of New Zealand's best mountain bike rides, the 42 Traverse. The forest also has excellent tramping, camping and deer hunting opportunities. In the heart of the regenerating forest is one of only a handful of national kiwi sanctuaries where the Department of Conservation controls alien predators to protect a population of the North Island Brown Kiwi.

History
Ōwhango began as a mill town, milling native timbers from around the local area. The last operational mill burned to the ground in the 1970s. Many of the mill houses are now holiday homes owned by city dwellers keen on the skiing, fishing, hunting, canoeing and tramping opportunities that abound in the surrounding area. The village had a permanent population of 177 (2013 census data) and has a primary school, garage (no fuel sold there, however), hotel, accommodation lodges, cottages for hire and bed and breakfast/homestay places and a café and public hall where the monthly market is held.

The pool was created by locals in the hope of preparing one of the local athletes for the British Empire and Commonwealth Games. Beside the pool is a monument marking the centenary of the Treaty of Waitangi. Local records indicate the pool was first ready for use over the 1939/1940 summer. In 1961 a conventional swimming pool in the grounds of the local school was opened.

The Ōwhango Hall was originally used as a silent movies cinema seating 250. In more recent times it has mainly been used for community meetings and events, indoors bowls, and market days.

The Ōwhango Volunteer Fire Brigade has been operating since 1965.

Demographics

The population of Ōwhango was 174 in the 2018 New Zealand census, a decrease of 3 (-1.7%) since the 2013 census, and a decrease of 15 (-7.9%) since the 2006 census. There were 84 males and 87 females, giving a sex ratio of 0.97 males per female. Ethnicities were 147 people  (84.5%) European/Pākehā, 48 (27.6%) Māori, and 3 (1.7%) Asian (totals add to more than 100% since people could identify with multiple ethnicities). Of the total population, 36 people  (20.7%) were under 15 years old, 27 (15.5%) were 15–29, 75 (43.1%) were 30–64, and 33 (19.0%) were over 65.

Farming and tourism are the largest employers.

Sports and events

The local sports teams generally dress in green and white. Historically, especially in the 1950s, the Ōwhango Domain played host to a sub-regional annual sports day. It is still used for occasional sports and school events.

The Ōwhango Hall is sometimes used for indoor bowls, and is also just big enough for one badminton court.

Regular events at the domain and hall include the annual Ōwhango Pumpkin Growing Competition, monthly community markets, and an annual T42 mountain biking, running and walking event.

Education

The earliest schooling in Ōwhango was in canvas tents, starting from about 1904 and coinciding with the construction of the railway line through the area. The first permanent school opened in 1910. The current school buildings date from about 1970, with the previous building later relocated to a nearby section.

The Taumaranui Mobile Library visits the school regularly, to provide access to children living remotely.

Notable people

Don Rowlands, rower

External links

Ōwhango Community website
Kayak Route: Estimated Grade 3 with many rapids

References

Ruapehu District
Populated places in Manawatū-Whanganui